Walford is a small village in Shropshire, England.

It is notable for its agricultural college (Walford and North Shropshire College). The B5067, Shrewsbury to Baschurch road, runs through the village.

The northern part of the village, which includes the college, is in the parish of Baschurch. The southern part, known as Walford Heath, is situated at the crossroads of the B5067 road with the Merrington to Yeaton lane, and is in the parish of Pimhill. The speed limit here has recently been reduced to 40 mph. There are a number of commercial premises and a post box.

Immediately to the east of Walford Heath lies the hamlet of Old Woods.

See also
Listed buildings in Baschurch

References

External links

Villages in Shropshire